Patal Rahimi (also Romanized as Pātal Raḩīmī) is a village in Khafri Rural District, in the Central District of Sepidan County, Fars Province, Iran. At the 2006 census, its population was 83, in 21 families.

References 

Populated places in Sepidan County